The 1999–2000 Samford Bulldogs men's basketball team represented Samford University in the 1999–2000 NCAA Division I men's basketball season. The Bulldogs, led by third-year head coach Jimmy Tillette, played their home games at the Pete Hanna Center in Homewood, Alabama as members of the Trans America Athletic Conference. After finishing third in the TAAC regular season standings, Samford won the TAAC tournament for the second straight season to receive an automatic bid to the NCAA tournament. As No. 13 seed in the Midwest region, the Bulldogs were defeated by No. 4 seed Syracuse in the opening round.

Roster 

Source

Schedule and results

|-
!colspan=12 style=| Regular season

|-
!colspan=12 style=| TAAC tournament

|-
!colspan=12 style=| NCAA tournament

|-

Source

References

Samford Bulldogs men's basketball seasons
Samford Bulldogs
Samford
Samford Bulldogs men's basketball
Samford Bulldogs men's basketball